Gebek Janku ibn Muhammad was the Khan (Nutsal) of Avaristan 1801–1802. He was a son of Muhammad ibn Umma. He ascended the throne, but was murdered on the orders of his sister and was succeeded by his father.

Year of birth missing
1802 deaths
Khans

Avar Khans
Avar Khanate
19th-century rulers
19th-century rulers in Europe
19th-century rulers in Asia